Yaegashi (written: 八重樫) is a Japanese surname. Notable people with the surname include:

, Japanese boxer
James Yaegashi, American actor
 Japanese footballer
Takehisa Yaegashi (born 1943), Japanese engineer and designer

Fictional characters
, a character in the light novel series Kokoro Connect

Japanese-language surnames